The Nuclear Energy Regulatory Agency (BAPETEN) is a non-Ministerial Government Institution (LPND) which is under and responsible to the President. BAPETEN has the tasks of implementing the surveillance of all activities of the use of nuclear energy in Indonesia through regulation, licensing and inspection in accordance with applicable laws and regulations. BAPETEN was founded on 8 May 1998 and began actively working on 4 January 1999.

History

1954 -1958
State Committee for the Investigation of Radioactivity

The establishment of this committee was based on the many nuclear tests carried on in the 1950s by several countries, especially the United States, in different regions of the Pacific, that have given rise to the concerns of radioactive material falling in parts of Indonesia. The task of this committee was to investigate the effect of nuclear testing, overseeing the use of nuclear energy, and providing annual reports to the government.

1958 - 1964
Atomic Energy Agency

The task of the Atomic Energy Agency was to conduct research in the field of nuclear power and to supervise the use of nuclear energy in Indonesia.

1964 - 1997
National Nuclear Energy Agency (BATAN)

BATAN’s task was to carry out nuclear energy research and supervise the use of nuclear energy in Indonesia. Supervision of nuclear energy usage was carried out by units under BATAN, the last of such unit was the Atomic Energy Control Bureau (BPTA).

In 2010, PT BatanTek (currently PT INUKI), a commercial company under BATAN, discontinued the high grades of radioisotopes due to International regulation. Now, PT BatanTek produces low grade radioisotope with its technique (electro plating) and is the only one in Asia to produce low grade radioisotope which is useful for 3D radiology imaging. The half-life of low grade radioisotope is relatively short and will be near zero in 60 hours, so Asia is a captive market for PT BatanTek.

1997 - Now
Nuclear Energy Regulatory Agency (BAPETEN)

National legislation, through Law Act No. 10/1997 on nuclear energy, has provided for the Nuclear Energy Control Board (BAPETEN) to carry out oversight functions against the use of nuclear energy, which includes licensing, inspection and enforcement of regulations. the Nuclear energy Act also requires the separation between the regulatory body, i.e. BAPETEN, and the research agency, i.e. BATAN.

See also
Nuclear power in Indonesia

References

External links
 Website of BAPETEN (Indonesian and English)

Nuclear power in Indonesia